Alpha Sagittarii (α Sagittarii, abbreviated Alpha Sgr, α Sgr), also named Rukbat , is a star in the constellation of Sagittarius.

Properties
 
Alpha Sagittarii is a blue, class B dwarf star. It does not appear particularly bright in the sky to the naked eye, with a visual apparent magnitude of +3.97.

The star has an effective temperature about twice that of the Sun and is nearly three times as massive, with a luminosity in visible wavelengths about 117 times that of the Sun. Based on an excess emission of infrared radiation, it may have a debris disk, much like Vega. It is a single-lined spectroscopic binary system. The ROSAT All Sky Survey discovered that Alpha Sagittarii is emitting an excess flux of X-rays, which is not expected to originate from a star of this spectral class. The most likely explanation is that the companion is an active pre-main sequence star or else a star that has just reached the main sequence.

Nomenclature

α Sagittarii (Latinised to Alpha Sagittarii) is the star's Bayer designation. It is unclear why Bayer designated this star as the alpha, rather than Epsilon Sagittarii or Sigma Sagittarii. This led some old star charts to occasionally depict Alpha and Beta Sagittarii as much brighter than they are in reality, as they are invisible from northern Europe, being too far south to see there.

The star bore the traditional names Rukbat and Alrami, derived from the Arabic rukbat al-rāmī 'the knee of the archer'. The star Delta Cassiopeiae also bore the traditional names Ruchbah or Rukbat, from the Arabic word ركبة rukbah meaning "knee". In 2016, the International Astronomical Union organized a Working Group on Star Names (WGSN) to catalog and standardize proper names for stars. The WGSN's first bulletin of July 2016 included a table of the first two batches of names approved by the WGSN; which included Rukbat for this star (Delta Cassiopeiae was later given the name Ruchbah).

This star, together with  Beta¹ Sagittarii and Beta² Sagittarii, were Al Ṣuradain (ألسردين), the two Surad, desert birds.

In popular culture
A fictionalized version of the Rukbat system is the setting for Anne McCaffrey's Dragonriders of Pern series of novels. In the canon of this series, the system has five planets in standard orbits, two asteroid belts, an Oort cloud, and has also captured a rogue planet into a highly eccentric orbit which passes both through the Oort cloud and through the inner solar system on a 250 year orbit.

References

External links 

Sagittarius (constellation)
Sagittarii, Alpha
B-type main-sequence stars
Rukbat
095347
181869
PD-40 08955
7348